The Rise Above Movement (RAM) is a militant alt-right Southern California-based street fighting group variously described as "a loose collective of violent neo-Nazis and fascists", white nationalist, white supremacist, and far-right. According to the Southern Poverty Law Center (SPLC), it "is inspired by identitarian movements in Europe and is trying to bring the philosophies and violent tactics to the United States." Its members are primarily located in the areas of Orange County and San Diego, and are variously numbered at 20 to 50. Individual RAM members are also members of other organizations, such as the self-described Identitarian Identity Evropa/American Identity Movement, the "Western chauvinist" Proud Boys, and the neo-Nazi skinhead Hammerskin Nation, according to Northern California Anti-Racist Action (NoCARA).

The group, which was started by Robert Rundo as DIY Division (DIY standing for Do It Yourself) before changing its name in early 2017, is described as a "militant racist and anti-Semitic group" which sees itself as defending Western civilization, which they claim is being undermined by "Muslims, immigrants and Jews", as well as liberals. The director of the SPLC's Intelligence Project, Heidi Beirich, said that members of the Rise Above Movement "think they're holding onto the old California, which was white, which was conservative, which was male-run, which was connected to the military ... and now that culture is being lost and they're fighting to bring it back. In other words, it's reactive."

According to ProPublica, RAM has "...a singular purpose: physically attacking its ideological foes. RAM's members spend weekends training in boxing and other martial arts, and they have boasted publicly of their violence during protests in Huntington Beach, San Bernardino and Berkeley. Many of the altercations have been captured on video ..." Because of its focus on street fighting, it has been described as "less like the Klan and more like a fight club". According to NoCARA:
[It is] a loose collective of violent neo-Nazis and fascists from Southern California that's organized and trains primarily to engage in fighting and violence at political rallies. They have been a central participant in the recent wave of far-Right protest movements in California during the first half of 2017 which have attempted to mobilize a broad range of right-wing constituents under the banners of protecting so-called "free speech,: unyielding support for Trump, and antipathy towards Muslims, immigrants, and other oppressed groups.

The group uses social media to recruit members, emphasizing the "fight club" aspect by posting videos of their training sessions, and refers to itself as the "premier MMA [mixed martial arts] club of the Alt-Right." According to the Anti-Defamation League, "While they consider themselves part of the alt right, R.A.M.'s membership has deep roots in California's racist skinhead movement, and includes individuals who have faced serious criminal charges, including assault, robbery and weapon offenses."

Social media accounts used by the group shared photographed of members meeting with far-right and neo-Nazi groups in Eastern Europe, such as the Ukrainian political party National Corps and the Azov Battalion. One way the group funds its activities is through the sale of online merchandise.

Arrests
On August 27, 2018, charges were filed by the United States attorney's office in Charlottesville against four members of the group in connection with their actions at the Unite the Right rally in 2017. They were arrested by the FBI, and the charges were unsealed and announced on October 2. The four California men – Benjamin D. Daley, 25, and Thomas W. Gillen, 34, both of Redondo Beach; Michael P. Miselis, 29, of Lawndale; and Cole E. White, 34, of Clayton – were charged with a single count each of violating the federal rioting statute and conspiring to violate it. According to an affidavit, the four men charged were "among the most violent individuals present in Charlottesville" for the rally. The charges were not related to the death of Heather Heyer.

On May 3, 2019, Daley and Miselis pled guilty to conspiring to riot, joining the other Rise Above members who had done so earlier. Three of the four were sentenced on July 19, Daley to 37 months, Gillen to 33 months, and Miselis to 27 months. Cole White was to be sentenced at a later date.

When Miselis was arrested, a search of his house found assault weapon ammunition, smoke bombs and flares, as well as a poster which read "88", code for "Heil Hitler" – "H" being the eighth letter of the alphabet. Miselis had recently met with members of violent white supremacist groups in Europe, according to prosecutors.

In October 2018, four other members of the group – Robert Rundo, Robert Boman, Tyler Laube and Aaron Eason – were charged with conspiracy in inciting political riots in relation to multiple incidents in southern California and the Unite the Right rally in Charlottesville. Rundo, described as the founder of the group, fled to Mexico and then to Central America, where he was arrested and extradited back to the United States.  He was arrested at Los Angeles International Airport. A search of his home found a large framed portrait of Adolf Hitler. Boman and Laube were arrested on October 24 in Southern California. Eason surrendered himself on October 29. Beside the Unite the Right rally, the incidents cited took place in Huntington Beach in March 2017 and in UC Berkeley in April 2017. While Laube pled guilty in November 2018, the others were indicted by a grand jury of one count each of violating the Anti-Riot Act of the Civil Rights Act of 1968. On appeal to the Ninth Circuit, the court ruled that the Anti-Riot Act was unconstitutional as it was overbroad in violation of the First Amendment", reversing the jury's ruling.

Robert Rundo, Robert Boman, and Tyler Laube were re-indicted in January 2023.

References

2017 establishments in the United States
2017 in American politics
Alt-right organizations
Neo-Nazism in the United States
Men's organizations
Organizations established in 2017
Political violence in the United States
Organizations that oppose LGBT rights in the United States
Neo-Nazi organizations in the United States
Anti-communist organizations in the United States